The Colorado Department of Early Childhood (CDEC) aims to provide services to young children, families with young children, and professionals who work with young children.  The department is charged with implementing tuition-free preschool for children in the year before they enter kindergarten throughout Colorado in the fall of 2023.

Structure 
CDEC is a principal department of the Colorado state government. The department includes the following boards, commissions, and committees:

Safe Child Care Task Force
Less than 24-Hour Child Care Licensing Appeals and Waiver Review Panel
Colorado Child Abuse Prevention Trust Fund
Colorado Interagency Coordinating Council
Early Childhood Leadership Commission
Early Childhood Sub-PAC

History
The department began operating on July 1, 2022. It was formed from the Office of Early Childhood in the Colorado Department of Human Services.

References

External links 
 

Early Childhood